"When Will You Fall for Me" is a song by Australian musical duo Vika and Linda. The song was written by Mark Seymour and was released as the first single from their debut studio album, Vika and Linda (1994), on 9 May 1994. The single peaked at number 51 on the Australian ARIA Singles Chart in July 1994 and remained within the top 100 for 16 weeks.

The duo recorded a ballad version of the song on their 2000 album, Live & Acoustic (Vika and Linda album) and a reggae version on their 2006 album, Between Two Shores.

Track listing
Australian CD single (D11690)
 "When Will You Fall for Me?"
 "Brand New Ways"

Charts

References

External links
 

1994 songs
1994 singles
Mushroom Records singles
Songs written by Mark Seymour